The 1994 New York Giants season was the franchise's 70th season in the National Football League (NFL) and the second under head coach Dan Reeves. The Giants failed to improve on their 11–5 record from 1993 and finished 9–7 in 1994. They were second in the National Football Conference East Division, three games behind the Dallas Cowboys.

In the 1994 NFL draft, the Giants selected wide receiver Thomas Lewis in the first round, with the 24th overall pick. New York began the season with a three-game winning streak, defeating the Philadelphia Eagles, Arizona Cardinals, and Washington Redskins. The Giants' first loss came in their fourth game, as the New Orleans Saints defeated them 27–22. The next six games were also losses; after the Cardinals beat them 10–9 in week 11, New York's record was 3–7. Against the Houston Oilers, the Giants snapped their seven-game losing streak by winning 13–10. The team won its next four games, moving into postseason contention following its second win over Philadelphia, which brought the Giants to 8–7. In the final game of the regular season, against the defending Super Bowl champion Cowboys, the Giants prevailed by five points. They needed a Green Bay loss as well to make the playoffs; the Packers won their last game; ending the Giants' season.

Rodney Hampton rushed for 1,075 yards and six touchdowns during the season; he was seventh in the NFL in rushing yards in 1994. The Giants' leading receiver statistically was Mike Sherrard, who caught 53 passes for 825 yards and six touchdowns. Dave Brown started 15 of 16 games at quarterback, and threw 12 touchdown passes and 16 interceptions. Defensively, Keith Hamilton and Erik Howard each had 6.5 sacks to lead the Giants, while John Booty and Phillippi Sparks each had a team-high three interceptions.

Offseason
The Giants went through some roster changes after the 1993 season in free agency. Among the departures were Bart Oates, who was signed by the San Francisco 49ers; Mark Collins, who the Kansas City Chiefs signed; Myron Guyton, who joined former coach Bill Parcells with the New England Patriots; and Perry Williams, who signed with the New York Jets. Simms started all 16 games in 1993, being one of only seven quarterbacks to do so, and was named a member of the Pro Bowl team for his performance, having led the Giants to an 11–5 season that included a victory over the Minnesota Vikings in the playoffs. However, Simms underwent shoulder surgery after the 1993 season to repair a torn labrum. The surgery was successful, and team doctor Russell F. Warren's prognosis for recovery was excellent. Simms was expected to be ready in time for training camp. However, later during that offseason, Simms was released by the Giants, and subsequently decided to retire.

NFL Draft

Personnel

Staff

Roster

Regular season

Schedule

Standings

References

New York Giants seasons
New York Giants
New York Giants season
20th century in East Rutherford, New Jersey
Meadowlands Sports Complex